Five Points is an unincorporated community in Washington County, Florida, United States. It is located along State Road 280 north of Vernon. It primarily based on the Five Points Recreation Center.

References

Five Points Recreation Center

Unincorporated communities in Washington County, Florida
Unincorporated communities in Florida